Muhammad Nasir-al-din is the name of:

Muhammad Naasiruddeen al-Albaanee (1914–1999), Albanian Islamic scholar
Nasir al-Din al-Tusi (1201–1274),  Persian polymath, architect, philosopher, physician, scientist, and theologian